Dodge Ram was a nameplate used for light trucks and vans marketed by Chrysler under its Dodge brand, before Ram Trucks was spun off as a separate brand for the 2011 model year.

Pickup trucks:
Dodge Ram pickup, full-size pickup truck previously marketed as Dodge D series or W series, rebranded simply as Ram under the Ram Trucks brand; includes Ram 1500, Ram 2500, and Ram 3500
Dodge Ram 50, compact pickup truck previously marketed as Dodge D50; based on Mitsubishi Mighty Max
Dodge Rampage, compact coupe utility

SUV:
Dodge Ramcharger, full-size SUV based on the D series and the first vehicle to use the Ram name; sometimes stylized as Ram Charger

Vans:
Dodge Ram Van, full-size van previously marketed as Dodge B series
Dodge Mini Ram, cargo version of Dodge Caravan minivan

See also
Dodge Caravan C/V, rebranded Dodge Mini Ram
Dodge D series, full-size Dodge pickup truck before Dodge Ram rebranding
Dodge Durango, successor to Ramcharger
Ram C/V, Dodge Caravan C/V rebranded under Ram Trucks
Ram Dakota, mid-size pickup truck marketed as Dodge Dakota prior to the introduction of Ram Trucks